A pneumatic gripper is a specific type of pneumatic actuator that typically involves either parallel or angular motion of surfaces, A.K.A. “tooling jaws or fingers” that will grip an object. The gripper makes use of compressed air which powers a piston rod inside the tool. As the piston rod is actuated, it drives a wedge, a cam, a rack and pinon, or pivot pins which translate linear motion into angular or parallel jaw motion. Grippers  exist both internal with and external bore grip with the same equipment because of an increased quantity of cross rollers in the parallel slide part.

References 

Actuators
Fluid dynamics